The borders of Russia changed through military conquests and by ideological and political unions in the course of over five centuries (1533–present).

Russian Tsardom and Empire 

The name Russia for the Grand Duchy of Moscow began to appear in the late 15th century, and became official in 1547 when the Tsardom of Russia was established. The Grand Duchy of Moscow was one of the successors in part of the territory of medieval Kievan Rus'. Another important starting point was the official end in 1480 of the overlordship of the Tatar Golden Horde over Moscovy, after its defeat in the Great Stand on the Ugra River. Ivan III (reigned 1462–1505) and Vasili III (reigned 1505–1533) had already expanded Muscovy's borders considerably by annexing the Novgorod Republic (1478), the Grand Duchy of Tver in 1485, the Pskov Republic in 1510, the Appanage of Volokolamsk in 1513, and the principalities of Ryazan in 1521 and Novhorod-Siverskyi in 1522.

After a period of political instability between 1598 and 1613, which became known as the Time of Troubles, the Romanovs came to power (1613) and the expansion-colonization process of the Tsardom continued. While western Europe colonized the New World, the Tsardom of Russia expanded overland – principally to the east, north and south.

This continued for centuries; by the end of the 19th century, the Russian Empire reached from the Baltic Sea, to the Black Sea, to the Pacific Ocean, and for some time included colonies in the Americas (1732–1867) and a short-lived unofficial colony in Africa (1889) in present-day Djibouti.

Expansion into Asia

The first stage from 1582 to 1650 resulted in North-East expansion from the Urals to the Pacific.  Geographical expeditions mapped much of Siberia. The second stage from 1785 to 1830 looked South to the areas between the Black Sea and the Caspian Sea.  The key areas were Armenia and Georgia, with some better penetration of the Ottoman Empire, and Persia. By 1829, Russia controlled all of the Caucasus as shown in the Treaty of Adrianople of 1829. The third era, 1850 to 1860, was a brief interlude jumping to the East Coast, annexing the region from the Amur River to Manchuria. The fourth era, 1865 to 1885 incorporated Turkestan, and the northern approaches to India, sparking British fears of a threat to India in the Great Game.

Historian Michael Khodarkovsky describes Tsarist Russia as a "hybrid empire" that combined elements of continental and colonial empires. According to Kazakh scholar Kereihan Amanzholov, Russian colonialism had "no essential difference with the colonialist policies of Britain, France, and other European powers". Qing China defeated Russia in the early Sino-Russian border conflicts, although the Russian Empire later acquired Outer Manchuria in the Amur Annexation. During the Boxer Rebellion, the Russian Empire invaded Manchuria in 1900, and the Blagoveshchensk massacre occurred against Chinese residents on the Russian side of the border. Russian Empire reached its maximum territory in Asia with the Russo-Japanese War, where after its defeat, Russia ceded Manchuria, southern Sakhalin, Russian Dalian, and Port Arthur to Japan with the Treaty of Portsmouth, though Russia kept the northern portion of the Chinese Eastern Railway.

Table of changes 
Czarist and imperial Russia's territorial gains and losses, up to the 1905 Russian Revolution, listed chronologically:

The Russian SFSR and the Soviet Union
After the October Revolution of November 1917, Poland and Finland became independent from Russia and remained so thereafter. The Russian empire ceased to exist, and the Russian SFSR, 1917–1991, was established on much of its territory. Its area of effective direct control varied greatly during the Russian Civil War of 1917 to 1922. Eventually the revolutionary Bolshevik government regained control of most of the former Eurasian lands of the Russian Empire, and in 1922 joined the RSFSR to Belarus, Transcaucasia, and Ukraine as the four constituent republics of a new state, the Union of Soviet Socialist Republics (or Soviet Union, USSR), which lasted until December 1991.

Territories of the former Russian Empire that permanently or temporarily became independent:
Crimean People's Republic, 1917–1918
Republic of Aras, 1918–1919
Alash Autonomy, 1917–1920
Kingdom of Lithuania (1918), 1918
Ukrainian People's Republic, Ukrainian State, 1917–1921
Duchy of Courland and Semigallia (1918), 1918
First Republic of Armenia, 1918–1920
Azerbaijan Democratic Republic, 1918–1920
Republic of Finland, 1917–
Kingdom of Finland (1918), 1918–1919
Belarusian Democratic Republic, 1918–1919
Balagad state, 1919–1926
North Caucasian Emirate, 1919–1920
Republic of Latvia, 1919–1940
Republic of Central Lithuania, 1920–1922
Centrocaspian Dictatorship, 1918
Democratic Republic of Georgia, 1918–1921
Moldavian Democratic Republic, 1917–1918
Mountainous Republic of the Northern Caucasus, 1917–1920 
North Ingria, 1919–1920 
Transcaucasian Democratic Federative Republic, 1918

In 1919, northern Mhlyn, Novozybkiv, Starodub, and Surazh counties (s) of Ukraine's Chernihiv Governorate were transferred from the Ukrainian SSR to the new Gomel Governorate of the Russian republic. In February 1924, Tahanrih and Shakhtinsky counties (okruhas) were transferred from the Donetsk Governorate of Ukraine to Russia's North Caucasus krai.

By the end of World War II the Soviet Union had annexed:

Western Belarus and Western Ukraine from the Second Polish Republic (see Territories of Poland annexed by the Soviet Union), annexed in September–October 1939
Estonia, Latvia, and Lithuania, occupied in August 1940
Bessarabia (Moldova), Hertsa, and part of Bukovina, occupied from Romania after an ultimatum in 1940
Karelia, occupied in 1941, Pechengsky Raion (Petsamo), in 1944, and parts of Salla, ceded in 1945 from Finland, and a 50-year lease on the naval base at Porkkala
Carpathian Ruthenia, formerly in Czechoslovakia and occupied in 1944
Tuva (independent 1921–1944; previously governed by Mongolia and by the Manchu Empire)
East Prussia (now Kaliningrad Oblast) from Germany, in 1945
The Klaipėda Region, annexed to Lithuania in 1945
The Kuril Islands and southern Sakhalin from Japan, occupied in 1945
Of these, Pechenga, Salla, Tuva, Kaliningrad Oblast, Klaipėda, the Kurils, and Sakhalin were added to the territory of the RSFSR.

The Chinese Eastern Railway, formerly a tsarist concession, was taken again by the Soviet Union after the 1929 Sino-Soviet conflict, the railway was returned in 1952.

Meanwhile, territories were removed from the Russian SFSR, including Turkmenistan and Uzbekistan in 1924, Kazakhstan and Kyrgyzstan in 1936, and Karelo-Finland from 1945 to 1956. The Crimean oblast and city of Sevastopol were transferred to Ukraine on 19 February 1954 (later annexed by the Russian Federation in 2014).

There were numerous minor border changes between Soviet republics as well.

After World War II, the Soviet Union set up seven satellite states, known as “European colonies”, while remaining independent though their politics, military, foreign and domestic policies were dominated by the Soviet Union:

 People's Socialist Republic of Albania (until 1961)
 People's Republic of Bulgaria
 Czechoslovak Socialist Republic
 German Democratic Republic
 Hungarian People's Republic
 Polish People's Republic
 Socialist Republic of Romania (until 1965)

Russian Federation

The dissolution of the Soviet Union has led to the creation of independent post-Soviet states, with the Russian SFSR declaring its independence in December 1991 and changing its name to the Russian Federation.

The Chechen Republic of Ichkeria was a secessionist government of the Chechen Republic during 1991–2000. After Russian defeat at the Battle of Grozny, the First Chechen War ended with Russia recognizing the new Ichkerian government of president Maskhadov in January 1997 and signing a peace treaty in May. But Russia invaded again in 1999, restoring a Chechen Republic and the Ichkeria government was exiled in 2000.

The Russian Federation has been involved in territorial disputes with several its neighbours, including with Japan over the Kuril Islands, with Latvia over the Pytalovsky Raion (settled in 1997), with China over parts of Tarabarov Island and Bolshoy Ussuriysky Island (settled in 2001), with its coastal neighbours over Caspian Sea boundaries, and with Estonia over the adjoining border. Russia also had disputes with Ukraine over the status of the federal city of Sevastopol, but agreed it belonged to Ukraine in the 1997 Russian–Ukrainian Friendship Treaty, and over the uninhabited Tuzla Island, but gave up this claim in the 2003 Treaty on the Sea of Azov and the Kerch Strait.

The Russian Federation has also used its armed forces, armed formations, and material support to help establish the disputed breakaway states of Transnistria in Moldova after the Transnistria War, and South Ossetia and Abkhazia, after the 2008 war in Georgia. In 2008, shortly after announcing the recognition of Abkhazia and South Ossetia, Russian president Dmitry Medvedev laid out a foreign policy challenging the US-dominated "single-pole" world order and claiming a privileged sphere of influence in the near abroad around the Russian Federation and farther abroad. Following these conflicts, both Transnistria and South Ossetia have made proposals for joining Russia.

In 2014, when after months of protests in Ukraine, pro-Russian Ukrainian president Viktor Yanukovych was deposed in the Revolution of Dignity, Russian troops occupied Ukraine's Crimean peninsula, and after a hasty referendum the Kremlin annexed Crimea and Sevastopol. The annexation was not recognized by Ukraine or most other members of the international community. A few weeks later, an armed conflict broke out the Donbas region of Ukraine, in which the Kremlin denies an active role, but is widely considered to be fuelled by soldiers, militants, weapons, and ammunition from the Russian Federation.

On February 21, 2022, the Russian president signed a decree recognizing the independence of two Donbas republics in Ukraine, and invaded the region. Two days later,  Russian troops openly invaded Ukrainian-held territory of Ukraine, a move widely seen as an attempt to conduct regime change and occupy much or all of Ukraine. After failing to seize Ukraine's capital Kyiv for over a month, the Russian defence minister stated that the main goal of the war was the "liberation of the Donbas", but later a Russian general stated that it was to seize eastern and southern Ukraine right through to Transnistria, a breakaway territory in Moldova.

On 30 September 2022, Putin announced in a speech that Russia was to annex four partially occupied regions of Ukraine: Donetsk, Kherson, Luhansk, and Zaporizhzhia Oblasts. However, Russia's annexation of these territories was widely condemned by the international community, and Russia does not control the full territory of any of the four annexed regions, and its government was unable to describe the new international "borders".

See also 
 Chechen–Russian conflict
 Foreign policy of the Russian Empire
 Foundations of Geopolitics
 History of the administrative division of Russia
 Internal colonialism
 Kaliningrad question
 Karelian question
 Moscow, third Rome
 Post-Soviet conflicts
 Russian imperialism
 Russian irredentism
 Near abroad
 Russian-occupied territories
 Russification
 Derussification
 Dissolution of Russia
 Soviet Empire
 Timeline of geopolitical changes
 List of national border changes from 1815 to 1914
 List of national border changes (1914–present)

References

Further reading
 Bassin, Mark. "Russia between Europe and Asia: the ideological construction of geographical space." Slavic review 50.1 (1991): 1–17. Online
 Bassin, Mark. "Expansion and colonialism on the eastern frontier: views of Siberia and the Far East in pre-Petrine Russia." Journal of Historical Geography 14.1 (1988): 3–21.
 Forsyth, James. "A History of the Peoples of Siberia: Russia's North Asian Colony 1581–1990" (1994)
 Foust, Clifford M. "Russian expansion to the east through the eighteenth century." Journal of Economic History 21.4 (1961): 469–482. Online
 LeDonne, John P. The Russian empire and the world, 1700–1917: The geopolitics of expansion and containment (Oxford University Press, 1997).
 McNeill, William H. Europe's Steppe Frontier: 1500–1800 (Chicago, 1975). 
 
 Plamen Mitev, ed. Empires and peninsulas: Southeastern Europe between Karlowitz and the Peace of Adrianople, 1699-1829 (LIT Verlag Münster, 2010).
 Treadgold, Donald W. "Russian expansion in the light of Turner's study of the American frontier." Agricultural History 26.4 (1952): 147–152. Online
 Velychenko, Stephen, The Issue of Russian Colonialism in Ukrainian Thought.Dependency Identity and Development, AB IMPERIO 1 (2002) 323-66

Atlases
 Blinnikov, Mikhail S. A geography of Russia and its neighbors (Guilford Press, 2011)
 Catchpole, Brian. A map history of Russia (1983)
 Chew, Allen F. An Atlas of Russian History: Eleven Centuries of Changing Borders (2nd ed. 1967)
 Gilbert, Martin. Routledge Atlas of Russian History (4th ed. 2007) excerpt and text search
 Parker, William Henry. An historical geography of Russia (University of London Press, 1968)
 Shaw, Denis J.B. Russia in the modern world: A new geography (Blackwell, 1998)

 
History of colonialism
History of ethnic groups in Russia
Geographic history of Russia
Imperialism
Russian Empire